The first season of the animated television series, Archer originally aired in the United States on the cable network FX. The season started on September 17, 2009, with "Mole Hunt" and ended with "Dial M for Mother" on March 18, 2010, with a total of ten episodes.

Episodes

Home media

References

External links
 
 

2009 American television seasons
2010 American television seasons
Archer (2009 TV series) seasons